Sierra Conservation Center (SCC) is a  state prison located in Tuolumne County, California, near the unincorporated community of Jamestown. Programs offered to prisoners include education, firefighting training, and sewing. 

As of July 31, 2022, SCC was incarcerating people at 65.9% of its design capacity, with 2,528 occupants.

References

External links

 Sierra Conservation Center official website 

1965 establishments in California
Prisons in California
Buildings and structures in Tuolumne County, California